Mary Paik Lee (August 17, 1900 – 1995) was a Korean American writer. She is most known for her autobiography, Quiet Odyssey: A Pioneer Korean Woman in America. She was born Paek Kuang-Sun in Pyongyang in the Korean Empire (now the capital of North Korea). Her parents decided to leave Korea when the Japanese and their growing presence in Korea took control over their home. In 1905, they arrived in Hawaii where they started anew.  Her father, Paik Sin Koo, came from a line of ministers and teachers but when they arrived in Hawaii, he became a contract laborer on a sugar plantation. They faced extreme discrimination and eventually moved to Riverside, California in 1906.

Over the course of her life, Lee, her parents, and her husband would suffer many hardships. Her memoir, Quiet Odyssey, was published in 1990. It is noted for being one of the few memoirs by an Asian American woman, and the only memoir by a Korean American woman that covers the majority of the twentieth century. She provides an important cultural viewpoint on the last century, from the perspective of one of America's first Korean pioneers.

Early life
 
The Paik family got to Riverside without much money or any immediate plans of action. After conferring with friends, they decided that Mary Lee's mother cook for about 30 men. Her father didn't like her working but they did not have much choice but to make do of what was available. They had to borrow materials from the Chinese settlement in order to start the cooking business.

On Saturdays, Mary would go to the slaughterhouse and collect the animal organs that the butchers threw out and thought not appropriate to sell. She competed with Mexican children for the preferred pieces of meat while the butchers laughed at them. At one point, she told her father that she didn't want to continue going because they were making fun of her but her father told her to be grateful that the butchers threw out the meat, or else they would starve.

When Mary was old enough, she went to school. On her first day, she was intimidated and frightened by a group of girls who danced in a circle around her. She was also frightened when the teacher welcomed her so she ran back home. She also found out that their Korean names were hard to remember so she decided to give her younger siblings American names while they were young. She and her older brother decided that it was too late for them to have American names.

Personal life
Mary married H.M. Lee and had 3 sons. She also continued to provide assistance to her parents and siblings. Though there was a constant battle with prejudice and discrimination, she worked hard to provide.

References

Bibliography
Chiu, Monica. "Constructing 'Home' in Mary Paik Lee's Quiet Odyssey: A Pioneer Korean 	Woman in America." Ed. Susan L. Roberson.U of Missouri P, 1998. 121-136. ProQuest. 	Web. 19 Sep. 2013.

Fujita-Rony, Dorothy. "A Shared Pacific Arena: Empire, Agriculture, and the Life Narratives of 	Mary Paik Lee, Angeles Monrayo, and Mary Tomita." Frontiers 34.2 (2013): 25,51,272. 	ProQuest. Web. 18 Sep. 2013.

External links

 Short biography and photo
 Biography by the University of California with excerpts from her autobiography

1900 births
1995 deaths
Korean emigrants to the United States
Korean women writers
American writers of Korean descent
People from Pyongyang
20th-century American women writers
20th-century Korean women